Dreamer (also known as Dreamer: Inspired by a True Story) is a 2005 American sports drama film written and directed by John Gatins in his directorial debut. The film stars Kurt Russell, Kris Kristofferson, Elisabeth Shue and Dakota Fanning. It is inspired by the true story of an injured Thoroughbred racehorse named Mariah's Storm. The film premiered at the Toronto International Film Festival on September 10, 2005 and was theatrically released on October 21, 2005 by DreamWorks Pictures. The film received mixed reviews from critics, and earned $39.5 million on a $32 million budget. It also received a Critics' Choice Award nomination for Best Family Film.

Plot

Ben Crane, a horse trainer who takes his work very seriously, neglects his precocious daughter while he pours his heart into the care of the horses that he trains.

Determined to make good on her father's overdue promise, Cale prods him to take her along to work and succeeds. One morning,  Soñador, the horse that is to enter the race that day, refuses to leave her stall. Ben mentions that one of her legs feels warm but his boss, Palmer, tells him to get Soñador on the track. During the race, the horse falls and injures herself so badly that Palmer demands the horse be put down. Having Cale along and not wanting her to see something like this, Ben instead strikes a bargain with Palmer and becomes the owner of the wounded horse but ends up losing his job as a result. With no job and facing foreclosure on his property, he decides to breed Soñador (who is nicknamed Sonya). Sonya gets a cast on her injured leg and slowly begins to recover.

Cale, having fallen in love at first sight with Soñador, begins to sneak out to the barn at night to see her. She also sneaks over to see her grandfather, 'Pop', Ben's dad, who loves teaching his granddaughter about horses.

They go to another farm to pick out a stallion to breed with Soñador, but the stud fee is too high. Ben's father gives Ben some money to use to breed, and Ben reluctantly takes it. But before they can breed, the vet tests Soñador and finds out she is unable to have a foal.

After, Cale hears her father tell her mother, Lilly, that Soñador has ruined them because she cannot have a foal. Lilly responds that Soñador is the best thing that has ever happened to them, alluding to the fact that Ben is finally spending much-needed time with Cale. Frustrated, Ben says that if Cale wasn't there the day when Soñador was hurt, he would have let her be put down.

Hurt after hearing the conversation, Cale sets out to run away from home and saddles Soñador. Not knowing of Cale's plan, Ben enters the barn. The door slams behind him, and a startled Soñador bolts out of the barn with Cale hanging on for dear life. Ben scrambles to his truck and sets out after them. He catches up and manages to get Cale to safety but also notices how fast Sonya is, despite her previous injury.

This incident begins to cement the newly forming bond between father and daughter. They realize that Soñador is very fast and decide to race her. Unfortunately, after the race she is claimed, and Cale is angry at her father for entering the horse in a claiming race.

At a parent-teacher night at school, Ben reads a story that Cale wrote about a king and his horse, and he realizes how much their family needs Soñador. He buys her back with money from his father. Cale decides to race Soñador in the Breeders’ Cup Classic, with Manny, Ben's colleague, as the jockey. They start training together and manage to get a wealthy sponsor.

On the day of the race, Ben notices Sonya's leg is warm and contemplates not racing her, scared that she may get injured again. This time however, Sonya refuses to go back in the stall. Manny and Sonya enter the race and eventually win.

Cast

Production

The movie is loosely inspired by the story of the mare Mariah's Storm. She was a promising filly who was being pointed towards the Breeders' Cup Juvenile Fillies in 1993 but then broke her cannon bone (the incident is mentioned in the film by Soñador's veterinarian). She recovered and later won some graded stakes races. She started in the 1995 Breeders' Cup Distaff and finished ninth. She was owned by Thunderhead Farms and trained by the father and son team of Don Von Hemel and Donnie K. Von Hemel. She is now known mostly for being the dam of Giant's Causeway. In the movie, when Cale and Ben go to Ashford Stud to check out the studs, the stallions they are naming, such as Fusaichi Pegasus, Giant's Causeway, Mariah's Storm, Johannesburg  and Grand Slam, are real horses who actually stand at Ashford. However, the actual stallions were not used in filming. Stand-ins were placed in their stalls instead. In the scene where Soñador is considered for the Breeder's Cup, Prince Sadir says that his horse "Rapid Cat is sired by Storm Cat, the best sire in the world." Coincidentally, Mariah's Storm (on whom Soñador is based) was bred to Storm Cat.

While doing research in Kentucky, the director/writer came upon a vet who told him about a racehorse who miraculously made a comeback after a serious injury, and he loosely based the script on this story. Before being picked up by DreamWorks, the script was presented to Paramount Pictures and Warner Bros, but both declined. Director John Gatins was told that if he could get Dakota Fanning in the lead role his movie would get a green-light. He went to see Fanning's agent and finally got the young actress to sign on. The role of Cale Crane was originally written for a boy, and the role was changed specifically so that Dakota Fanning could play it. The first script that was sent to Fanning actually had the word "boy" in the character description.

To produce the soundtrack, an advance showing of this film was shown to a number of recording artists, who were then asked to submit ideas for theme songs. Bethany Dillon's song "Dreamer" was chosen out of all the submissions. After the movie, Kurt Russell bought Dakota Fanning a real Palomino horse, whom she named Goldie.

Music
 "Theme From Dreamer"
 "The Stand Off: 1st Ride"
 "First Race"
 "Ben Asks Pop For Help"
 "Sonador In Harness"
 "Popsicles"
 "Manny's Story"
 "Testing Sonador's Leg"
 "2nd Ride: Thunderpants"
 "Runaway Horse"
 "Exercising Sonador"
 "The Noble King"
 "New Owner Montage"
 "Training Montage"
 "Smart And Beautiful"
 "Sonador Chosen"
 "Cale Won't Sell Sonador"
 "Leaving Sadir's"
 "She's Ready To Run"
 "She Wants To Race"
 "Last Race"
 "End Credit Medley"
 "Dreamer" (Film Mix) – Bethany Dillon
 "Main Title" (Film Version)
 "Dreamer" [Hidden Bonus Track] (Pop Mix)

Release

The film premiered at the Toronto International Film Festival on September 10, 2005 and released theatrically on October 21, 2005 by DreamWorks Pictures.

Reception

Box office
Dreamer opened in second place at the box office behind Doom, with $9,178,233 earned for a $4,573 average from 2,007 theaters. In its second weekend, it held well with a 33.2% drop to fourth place with $6,132,856 earned for a $2,462 average from being expanded to 2,491 theaters and lifting its two-week total to $17,374,339. It held up even better in its third weekend, only slipping 21.8% to sixth place and $4,794,741 for a $1,832 average from being expanded to 2,617 theaters. In its fourth weekend, it once again held well with a 22.2% slide to $3,728,510 and ninth place, for a $1,363 average from being expanded to its widest release, 2,735 theaters.

The film closed on January 5, 2006, after 77 days of release and grossing $32,751,093 domestically along with an additional $5,990,639 overseas for a worldwide total of $38,741,732. Produced on a $32 million budget, the film performed average at the box office, as it barely recouped its budget.

Critical response
On Rotten Tomatoes, the film has a rating of 64%, based on 117 reviews, with an average rating of 6.3/10. The site's critical consensus reads, "Though formulaic, this horse story's saving grace is its strong performances." On Metacritic, the film has a weighted average score of 59 out of 100, based on reviews 28 critics, indicating "mixed or average reviews". Audiences polled by CinemaScore gave the film a rare grade of "A+" on an A+ to F scale.

Roger Ebert of the Chicago Sun-Times gave it 3 out of 4 stars, and called "A well-made use of familiar materials." He praised the central performance of Dakota Fanning, and the understated performances by Russell, Kristofferson and Morse.
Joe Leydon of Variety called it "Modestly engaging but mostly unexceptional."
Kirk Honeycutt of The Hollywood Reporter said it "Recycles just about every sentimental ploy and cliche from a raft of horse racing movies."

Accolades

Broadcast Film Critics Association Awards 2006

ESPY Awards 2006

Kids' Choice Awards, USA 2006

Young Artist Awards 2006

References

External links
 
 
 Trailer
 Horseweb.com article "Real-Life Horse Mariah's Storm Served as the Main Inspiration for the Movie's Title Character"

2005 films
2000s sports drama films
American sports drama films
American horse racing films
Films about horses
DreamWorks Pictures films
American films based on actual events
Films set in Kentucky
Films shot in Kentucky
Films scored by John Debney
Films with screenplays by John Gatins
Hyde Park Entertainment films
2005 directorial debut films
2005 drama films
2000s English-language films
2000s American films